Next Stop Paradise is a 1998 Romanian film directed by Lucian Pintilie. It was entered into the 55th Venice International Film Festival. The film was selected as the Romanian entry for the Best Foreign Language Film at the 71st Academy Awards, but was not accepted as a nominee.

Cast
 Costel Cascaval as Mitu
 Dorina Chiriac as Norica
 Gheorghe Visu as Vatasescu
 Victor Rebengiuc as Grigore Cafanu
 Razvan Vasilescu as Capt. Burcea
 Gabriel Spahiu as Nelu
 Dan Tudor	
 Doru Ana as Gili

See also
 List of submissions to the 71st Academy Awards for Best Foreign Language Film
 List of Romanian submissions for the Academy Award for Best Foreign Language Film

References

External links
 
 Terminus Paradis at Cinemagia.ro

1998 films
Romanian drama films
1990s Romanian-language films
Films directed by Lucian Pintilie
Venice Grand Jury Prize winners
1998 drama films